Fredrik Johansson (born 18 March 1978 in Uppsala) is a Swedish professional racing cyclist.

Career highlights

 2003: 1st in Stage 4 3 dagars Hammarö, Hammarö (SWE)
 2004: 3rd in General Classification Tour du Brabant Wallon, Ottignies (BEL)
 2004: 3rd in National Championship, Road, ITT, Elite, Sweden, Sollerön (SWE)
 2004: 3rd in GP Demy-Cars (LUX)
 2004: 3rd in GP Claude Criquielion (BEL)
 2006: 2nd in Prix de la Ville de Nogent-sur-Oise (FRA)
 2006: 3rd in GP Faber (LUX)
 2006: 1st in Boucles de la Marne (FRA)
 2006: 1st in GP Demy-Cars (LUX)
 2006: 3rd in Internatie Reningelst, Reningelst (BEL)
 2006: 2nd in General Classification Tour de Namur, Namur-Citadel (BEL)
 2006: 2nd in Vlaamse/Antwerpse Havenpijl (BEL)
 2007: 1st in General Classification Ronde de l'Oise (FRA)
 2007: 3rd in Herning (b) (DEN)
 2007: 2nd in Padborg/Bov CC, Padborg (DEN)
 2008: 1st in Stage 4 Jelajah Malaysia, Muar (MAS)
 2008: 3rd in General Classification Jelajah Malaysia (MAS)

External links
 
 

1978 births
Living people
Swedish male cyclists
People from Uppsala Municipality
Sportspeople from Uppsala County